Xi Yin (born December 1983 ) is a Chinese-American theoretical physicist.

Biography
Yin was accepted to University of Science and Technology of China in 1996, at the age of 12, and completed the (then) 5-year bachelor program in 2001. He gained a PhD at Harvard University in 2006, under the supervision of Andrew Strominger. He was a Junior Fellow at the Harvard Society of Fellows, and a Visiting Member at the Institute for Advanced Study. He joined the Harvard faculty in 2008, and is now a Professor of Physics.

Yin is a recipient of NSF CAREER Award, Sloan Research Fellowship, and New Horizons in Physics Prize. He is a Simons Investigator, and a principal investigator of the Simons Bootstrap Collaboration.

Yin ran the Boston marathon three times, and completed the Leadville Trail 100 Run in 2011.

References

External links

1983 births
Living people
21st-century American physicists
21st-century Chinese scientists
Chinese emigrants to the United States
Harvard Graduate School of Arts and Sciences alumni
Harvard College faculty
People from Zhuzhou
Scientists from Hunan
Theoretical physicists
University of Science and Technology of China alumni